Conway Elder (1880 – December 10, 1957) was a justice of the Supreme Court of Missouri from 1921 to 1922.

Elder received his law degree from Washington University School of Law in St. Louis, and gained admission to the bar in Missouri in 1905. He was elected to the Missouri Senate as a Republican in 1914, and reelected in 1918. In 1920, he was elected to a two-year term on the state supreme court, but was defeated by Democrat William T. Ragland in his bid for reelection in 1922. In 1924, the Supreme Court of the United States appointed Elder to serve as a special commissioner to resolve a boundary line dispute in the case of Michigan v. Wisconsin, which was ultimately decided in 1926. Following this service, Elder returned to the private practice of law until several years before his death.

Elder died at St. Louis County Hospital at the age of 77.

References

1880 births
1957 deaths
Washington University School of Law alumni
Missouri state senators
Judges of the Supreme Court of Missouri